Tylophoropsis is a genus of lichenized fungi in the family Caliciaceae, although the placement in this family is uncertain. This is a monotypic genus, containing the single species Tylophoropsis nyeriana, found in Africa.

References

Fungi of Africa
Teloschistales
Lichen genera
Caliciales genera
Monotypic Lecanoromycetes genera